Events from the year 1955 in Canada.

Incumbents

Crown 
 Monarch – Elizabeth II

Federal government 
 Governor General – Vincent Massey
 Prime Minister – Louis St. Laurent
 Chief Justice of Canada – Patrick Kerwin (Ontario)
 Parliament – 22nd

Provincial governments

Lieutenant governors 
Lieutenant Governor of Alberta – John J. Bowlen   
Lieutenant Governor of British Columbia – Clarence Wallace (until October 3) then Frank Mackenzie Ross 
Lieutenant Governor of Manitoba – John Stewart McDiarmid 
Lieutenant Governor of New Brunswick – David Laurence MacLaren 
Lieutenant Governor of Newfoundland – Leonard Outerbridge 
Lieutenant Governor of Nova Scotia – Alistair Fraser 
Lieutenant Governor of Ontario – Louis Orville Breithaupt 
Lieutenant Governor of Prince Edward Island – Thomas William Lemuel Prowse 
Lieutenant Governor of Quebec – Gaspard Fauteux  
Lieutenant Governor of Saskatchewan – William John Patterson

Premiers 
Premier of Alberta – Ernest Manning   
Premier of British Columbia – W.A.C. Bennett 
Premier of Manitoba – Douglas Campbell 
Premier of New Brunswick – Hugh John Flemming  
Premier of Newfoundland – Joey Smallwood 
Premier of Nova Scotia – Henry Hicks 
Premier of Ontario – Leslie Frost 
Premier of Prince Edward Island – Alex Matheson 
Premier of Quebec – Maurice Duplessis 
Premier of Saskatchewan – Tommy Douglas

Territorial governments

Commissioners 
 Commissioner of Yukon – Wilfred George Brown (until June 8) then Frederick Howard Collins 
 Commissioner of Northwest Territories – Robert Gordon Robertson

Events
January 7 – The first television broadcast of the opening of parliament
February 1 – The Bank of Toronto and The Dominion Bank merge to form the Toronto-Dominion Bank
February 23 - Military exercise Operation Bulldog III in Yellowknife.
March 17- Richard Riot
April 2 – The Angus L. Macdonald Bridge connecting Halifax  to Dartmouth opens.
June 9 – 1955 Ontario general election: Leslie Frost's PCs win a fourth consecutive majority
June 29 – 1955 Alberta general election: Ernest Manning's Social Credit Party wins a sixth consecutive majority.
July 11 – Seven teenagers die in a mountaineering accident on Mount Temple in Banff National Park.
 Cape Breton Island is connected to the mainland by the Canso Causeway

Arts and literature

New books
Gabrielle Roy: Rue Deschambault

Awards
See 1955 Governor General's Awards for a complete list of winners and finalists for those awards.
Stephen Leacock Award: Robertson Davies, Leaven of Malice

Music
Glenn Gould's first recording of the Goldberg Variations is made.

Sport
March 17 – A riot erupts in Montreal when Maurice Richard is suspended.
April 14 - Detroit Red Wings won their Seventh (and last until 1997) Stanley Cup by defeating the Montreal Canadiens 4 games to 3.
April 29 - Ontario Hockey Association's Toronto Marlboros won their Second (and First since 1929) Memorial Cup by defeating the Saskatchewan Junior Hockey League's Regina Pats 4 games to 1.All games were played at Regina Exhibition Stadium
November 26 - Edmonton Eskimos won their Second(consecutive) Grey Cup by defeating the Montreal Alouettes by the score of 34 to 19 in the 43rd Grey Cup played at Empire Stadium in Vancouver
The Canadian Sports Hall of Fame is created.

Births

January to June
January 1 – Precious, wrestler and manager
January 4 – John Nunziata, politician
January 6 – Alex Forsyth, ice hockey player
January 8 – Joan Kingston, nurse, educator, and politician
January 10 - Eva Aariak, politician, and 2nd Premier of Nunavut
January 28 – Odette Lapierre, long-distance runner
February 23 – Jerry Holland, fiddler
February 25 – Camille Thériault, politician and 29th Premier of New Brunswick
February 27 – MaryAnn Mihychuk, politician
March 16 – Andy Scott, politician and Minister
April 6 – Cathy Jones, comedian and writer
April 25 – Jane Stewart, politician and Minister
May 12 – Yvon Godin, politician
May 14 – Marie Chouinard, dancer, choreographer and dance company director
June 14 – Joe Preston, politician
June 16 – J. Jill Robinson, writer

July to December

July 7 – Gord Mackintosh, politician
July 13 – Hubert Lacroix, lawyer and President and CEO of the Canadian Broadcasting Corporation
July 17 – Geneviève Cadieux, artist
July 19 – Dalton McGuinty, lawyer, politician and 24th Premier of Ontario
August 6 – Gilles Bernier, politician
August 12 – Tooker Gomberg, politician and environmental activist (d. 2004)
August 19 – Bev Desjarlais, politician
August 31 – Sidney McKnight, boxer

September 28 – Stéphane Dion, politician and Minister
October 12 – Issa, singer-songwriter
November 4 – Rodger Cuzner, politician
November 10 – Ken Holland, ice hockey player
November 11 – Teri York, diver
December 13 – Pat Martin, politician
October 30-Metis and Reform Member of Parliament (MP) James A. Hart was born in Edmonton, Alberta

Full date unknown
Vatche Arslanian, Canadian Red Cross worker, killed in Iraq (d. 2003)
Kim Morrissey, poet and playwright

Deaths
April 24 – Walter Seymour Allward, sculptor (b. 1876)
April 26 – Lyman Duff, jurist and Chief Justice of Canada (b. 1865)
May 10 – Tommy Burns, only Canadian born world heavyweight champion boxer (b. 1881)
June 16 – Ozias Leduc, painter (b. 1864)
August 5 – Izaak Walton Killam, financier (b. 1885)
August 7 – Alexander Stirling MacMillan, businessman, politician and Premier of Nova Scotia (b. 1871)
October 1 – Charles Christie, motion picture studio owner (b. 1880)

See also
 List of Canadian films

References

 
Years of the 20th century in Canada